Ryan Gary Raddon (born February 25, 1971), better known by his stage name Kaskade, is an American DJ, record producer and remixer. DJ Times voted Kaskade "America's Best DJ" in 2011 and 2013. DJ Mag named Kaskade fifty-first on its 2009 list of Top 100 DJs.

Early life
Born in Chicago, Kaskade grew up in nearby Northbrook and attended Glenbrook North High School. As a teenager, he would shop for music at Gramaphone Records on Clark Street in Chicago. His brother, Rich Raddon, became an entrepreneur and film producer. He attended Brigham Young University in Provo, Utah from 1989 to 1990, working on his DJ skills in his dorm room. At age 19, Raddon served a two-year full-time mission for the Church of Jesus Christ of Latter-day Saints in Japan. Following his mission, in 1992, he moved to Salt Lake City to attend the University of Utah, eventually graduating with a degree in communications. While attending school, Kaskade and his close friend Jodi Call ran a record store in Salt Lake City called Mechanized.

Musical career

1995–2000: Early beginnings
In 1995, Raddon began DJing his first monthly Monday night party at a basement venue called Club Manhattan. He used this additional income to purchase studio essentials. In May 2000, Raddon moved to San Francisco with his wife where he got a job working as an A&R assistant to John Elkins at Om Records, a house and electronic label. To Raddon's benefit, San Francisco was an emerging site of a new deep house movement. While at OM records he continued DJing and producing music. Soon after, Raddon created his alter ego, Kaskade, which his wife worried would remind people of the dish detergent. He took his stage name from a nature book when he saw a picture of a waterfall and a co-worker agreed "cascade" was a good choice, but he then changed the spelling. He did not take his name from the Cascade Range in the Pacific Northwest as fans sometimes cite.

After mixing the third volume in the Sounds of Om series, Ryan was offered a three-album deal for Kaskade. He kicked off the deal with a full-length house debut, It's You It's Me. Garnering critical acclaim, spawning several singles, and receiving a prestigious Dance Star nomination for Best New Artist, the release put Kaskade squarely on the dance music world's radar. Concentrating on his DJing skills, Kaskade started to experiment and develop his own sound.

2001–2006: Debut single
Kaskade released his first single "What I Say" on the label in 2001. In the Moment saw Kaskade's first top 10 single with "Steppin' Out" reaching No. 5 on Billboard Magazine's Hot Dance Club Play chart and No. 6 on Dance Radio Airplay. The fourth single to be released from the album, "Everything", reached No. 1 on Billboard Magazine's Hot Dance Club Play.

Kaskade's fourth solo album Love Mysterious was released in September 2006. The first single from the album, "Be Still", reached No. 4 on Billboard Magazine'''s Hot Dance Club Play. The single features vocalist Sunsun, and includes remixes by Jay-J and Robbie Rivera. Follow up single "Stars Align" hit number No. 8 on "Billboard Magazine" Hot Dance Airplay chart and just missed the top ten, No. 11, on the Hot Dance Club Play chart. His fourth single released from "Love Mysterious", "Sorry", was his third consecutive top ten hit on Billboard's Hot Dance Airplay Chart, at No. 9. Dirty South provided a remix for "Sorry". The remix was nominated for a 2008 Grammy for Best Remixed Recording.

2006–2009: Ultra Records and deadmau5
In late 2006, Kaskade left OM Records and signed with Ultra Records.

Kaskade worked with Canadian electronic musician deadmau5 to produce tracks on Strobelite Seduction, including the first single (released as an EP) "Move for Me". The single became his fifth top ten hit on Billboard's Hot Dance Airplay Chart, reaching the number one position in its September 6, 2008 issue. It also gave Kaskade his first number one single on this chart. The dance single has become a crossover hit, managing to reach number 71 on the Canadian Hot 100 as of February 14, 2009. "I Remember", another collaboration with deadmau5, became his first UK hit, peaking inside the top 15 on the UK Singles Chart. The video-clip which accompanied "I Remember" was filmed in Manchester, England. The single became his second chart topper on the Billboard dance chart. The follow-up single, "Angel on My Shoulder" with Tamra Keenan, also found success on the dance chart, placing at number 5 on Billboard's Hot Dance Airplay Chart. His song "Step One Two" was the last single from the album, being released late in 2008.

2010–2015: Headlining UMF and Grammy nominations
In 2010, he added another number one Billboard Hot Dance Airplay track to his credit with "Dynasty", featuring Haley Gibby on vocals.

In March 2012, Kaskade headlined at Ultra Music Festival in Miami, Florida, coming on before Armin van Buuren Sunday night.

In April 2012, Kaskade took to Indio, California to play two weekends at Coachella Valley Music Festival. In June 2012, the American House producer was one of the headlining acts at Electric Daisy Carnival in Las Vegas, Nevada. That same month, he started the "Freaks of Nature" summer tour in support of his released album Fire & Ice.

In December 2013, Kaskade was nominated for two Grammy Awards: the song "Atmosphere" for Best Dance Recording and the album Atmosphere for Best Dance/Electronica Album.

In 2014, Kaskade was listed as the No. 8 highest paid DJ in the world according to Forbes, earning $17 million.

In 2015, he was a guest star on BYUtv's Studio C. Additionally in 2015, he headlined Coachella alongside Drake for two weekends and, over the course of the two weekends, pulled in the two largest crowds the festival had ever seen.

2015–present: Automatic, Kaskade Christmas and Kx5
On September 25, 2015, Kaskade released his album Automatic featuring collaborations with CID, Galantis, John Dahlbäck and Two Nations.

On November 24, 2017, Kaskade released a Christmas-themed album titled "Kaskade Christmas".

In 2022, Kaskade and Deadmau5 announced a collaboration project named Kx5, marking the fourth time the producers have worked together. The first single from the project, "Escape", was released on March 11. On January 27, 2023, Deadmau5 announced the self-titled Kx5 album will be releasing March 17, 2023.

Other projects
On May 30, 2010, Kaskade became a resident DJ for daytime pool parties at the Encore Beach Club in Las Vegas, NV. The parties were entitled "Kaskade Sundays".

Personal life
Raddon is married and has three children. He is a member of the Church of Jesus Christ of Latter-day Saints.

Discography

 It's You, It's Me (2003)
 In the Moment (2004)
 The Calm (2006)
 Love Mysterious (2006)
 Strobelite Seduction (2008)
 Dynasty (2010)
 Fire & Ice (2011)
 Atmosphere (2013)
 Automatic (2015)
 Kaskade Christmas (2017)

 Official tours 
 Urban Tour (2011)
 Freaks of Nature Tour (2012)
 United States Formula 1 Grand Prix Weekend (2012)
 It's You, It's Me Redux Tour (2013)
 Atmosphere Tour (2013)
 Redux Tour 001(2014)
 Automatic Tour (2015)
 Redux 002 (2017)
 Redux 003 (2019)

Awards and nominations

Grammy Awards

|-
| style="text-align:center;"| 2013 || Fire & Ice || style="text-align:center;" rowspan="2"| Best Dance/Electronica Album || 
|-
| style="text-align:center;" rowspan="2"| 2014 || Atmosphere || 
|-
| "Atmosphere" || style="text-align:center;"| Best Dance Recording || 
|-
| style="text-align:center;"| 2015 || "Smile (Kaskade Edit)" || style="text-align:center;" rowspan="1"| Best Remixed Recording, Non-Classical || 
|-
| style="text-align:center;"| 2016 || "Runaway (U & I) (Kaskade Remix)" || style="text-align:center;" rowspan="1"| Best Remixed Recording, Non-Classical || 
|-
| style="text-align:center;"| 2017 || "Only (Kaskade x Lipless Remix)" || style="text-align:center;" rowspan="1"| Best Remixed Recording, Non-Classical || 
|-
| style="text-align:center;"| 2019 || Stargazing (Kaskade Remix)'' || style="text-align:center;" rowspan="1"| Best Remixed Recording, Non-Classical ||

America's Best DJ Award

See also
Om Records
List of number-one dance hits (United States)
List of artists who reached number one on the US Dance chart
List of artists who reached number one on the U.S. dance airplay chart

References

External links

Artist Site at Ultra Records

1971 births
20th-century American musicians
21st-century American musicians
Ableton Live users
American DJs
American male musicians
American electronic musicians
American house musicians
Latter Day Saints from Illinois
Brigham Young University alumni
Club DJs
Glenbrook North High School alumni
Living people
DJs from Chicago
Musicians from Chicago
People from Northbrook, Illinois
Progressive house musicians
Remixers
Ultra Records artists
University of Utah alumni
Electronic dance music DJs
Monstercat artists
Monstercat Silk artists